Iris Williams OBE (born 20 April 1944) is a Welsh singer.  Williams reached the peak of her popularity during the 1980s.

Early life and education
Williams was born in Rhydyfelin. Brought up in a children's home in Tonyrefail, and later adopted by the Llewellyn family, she worked in a factory and then won a scholarship to the Royal Welsh College of Music & Drama.

Career
In 1979, she had her biggest UK hit, "He Was Beautiful", a song based on the already well-known theme from The Deer Hunter with lyrics by Cleo Laine.  In Wales, however, she had already had major success, particularly with "Pererin Wyf" (1971) a Welsh-language version of "Amazing Grace".  As a result of hitting the national charts, she was given her own BBC series. She also won the Welsh talent contest, Cân i Gymru (A Song for Wales) in 1974 with the song 'I gael Cymru'n Gymru Rydd' (For a Free Wales).

In 1991, she performed in cabaret at the prestigious Oak Room in the Algonquin Hotel in New York City. Other engagements in the United States included five concerts with Bob Hope and an appearance with Rosemary Clooney. Iris also gave several charity performances for President Gerald Ford.  She has performed several times at the Royal Variety Performance, and was one of the stars of the gala concert to celebrate the opening of the National Assembly for Wales in 1999).

Personal life
In the early 1980s Williams took ownership of a public house near Ascot in Berkshire named 'The Pheasant Plucker', so named by her “extrovert” second husband – combining running it with appearances on the club circuit, before relocating to New York in the early 1990s.

She married Clive Pyatt in 1982 and their son Blake was born in 1984.  She was awarded the OBE (Officer of the Order of the British Empire) in the New Year Honours List of 2004.  In 2006, she performed at the Brecon Jazz Festival, and was later admitted to the Gorsedd of Bards at the National Eisteddfod of Wales.

Williams now lives permanently in Rancho Mirage, California.

References

Welsh women singers
Alumni of the Royal Welsh College of Music & Drama
Living people
People from Pontypridd
Bards of the Gorsedd
1944 births